Somokluy, also rendered as Somoklu or Sumilku, may refer to:
 Somokluy-e Olya
 Somokluy-e Sofla